Zach Sherwin (born July 1, 1980) is an American comedian, rapper, writer, and actor best known for writing for and performing in the Epic Rap Battles of History YouTube series, as well as writing for Crazy Ex-Girlfriend on The CW. He specializes in comedic rap. He previously performed with The Late Night Players, and under the stage name MC Mr. Napkins.

Early life and education
Sherwin was born in Cleveland, Ohio and raised in Cincinnati, Ohio and southwest Missouri. His mother was a rabbi, and he continues to identify as Jewish.

He attended college at Brandeis University and graduated in 2002. At Brandeis, Sherwin became an Ethics Center Student Fellow (known as the Sorensen Fellowship since 2009) while interning at Ikamva Labantu in Cape Town, South Africa. While in college, Sherwin started a sketch comedy group, The Late Night Players. His fellow members included Andrew Slack and Seth Reibstein, founders of the Harry Potter Alliance, and Aaron Kagan.

Career
Sherwin continued to perform with The Late Night Players after graduating from Brandeis until the group's dissolution in 2007. The group was the subject of a documentary directed by Joshua Goren which screened at the November 2006 New York International Independent Film and Video Festival.

Sherwin began to perform solo as MC Mr. Napkins in Boston from 2007 until giving up the name completely in 2013 in a video posted to his YouTube channel. As a solo comedian, Sherwin has performed multiple times at The Knitting Factory. He has appeared in multiple shows at UCB. Sherwin appeared on the debut episode of Cameron Esposito's ASpecialThing-produced stand-up comedy podcast Put Your Hands Together.

Sherwin was one of the original performers involved with the Epic Rap Battles of History YouTube series. As of January 2022, he has appeared in eleven episodes, having portrayed Albert Einstein, Emmett Brown, Sherlock Holmes, Ebenezer Scrooge, Stephen King, Wayne Gretzky, Egon Spengler, Voltaire, Walt Disney, Alexander The Great, and John Wick. Along with co-creators Peter Shukoff and Lloyd Ahlquist, Sherwin has acted in, and written for, episodes in every season of the series. In 2014, Epic Rap Battles of History won a Streamy Award for Best Writing. In 2015, the series was nominated for the same award. In 2016, the series was nominated for Streamy Awards for Best Collaboration and Best Writing.

Since 2015, Zach Sherwin has written for the CW series Crazy Ex-Girlfriend. He co-wrote the songs "JAP Battle", "JAP Battle (Reprise)", "I Give Good Parent", and "So Maternal". The first season of the series was nominated for multiple awards and holds a 96% positive rating on Rotten Tomatoes.

Sherwin auditioned for Season 11 of America's Got Talent in 2016. His performance in the Judge Cuts round was televised, however he did not proceed to the Quarterfinals round.

Sherwin writes, produces, and hosts a series of live crossword puzzle comedy shows entitled "The Crossword Show", in which three panelists race to solve a crossword puzzle on stage. The shows include comedy raps, videos, and humorous facts prepared for each clue. The format is similar to NPR's Wait Wait... Don't Tell Me!. Notable guest solvers have included Mayim Bialik, Pete Holmes, Rachel Bloom, Lisa Loeb, Josh Gondelman, and Aparna Nancherla.

Personal life
Sherwin lives in Los Angeles, California. He is a vegan.

Discography

Studio albums

Filmography

References

External links
 
 

American television writers
Living people
American comedy musicians
Brandeis University alumni
Jewish rappers
Male actors from Cleveland
Male actors from Missouri
Rappers from Cleveland
Musicians from Springfield, Missouri
Writers from Springfield, Missouri
Writers from Cleveland
American male television writers
1980 births
Screenwriters from Ohio
21st-century American rappers
21st-century American comedians
America's Got Talent contestants